Pauridia serrata is a species of flowering plant from the genus Pauridia.

Taxonomy
Pauridia serrata contains the following subspecies:
 Pauridia serrata subsp. serrata
 Pauridia serrata subsp. albiflora

References

Hypoxidaceae